Parliamentary elections were held in the Byelorussian Soviet Socialist Republic in 1990 to elect the twelfth Supreme Council. A total of 1,427 candidates contested the 310 seats, while a further 50 members were appointed by organizations of veterans and invalids.

Results
In the first round of voting on 4 March, 98 deputies were elected. A second round on 17–18 March saw a further 131 deputies were elected. However, this was still below the quorum of 240. By-elections were subsequently held on 22 April (18 districts) and 5 May (63 districts) resulting in a further 38 deputies being elected. An additional eleven were elected in second rounds held between 10 and 14 May, taking the total number of elected deputies to 278, in addition to the 50 appointed deputies.

The Belarusian Popular Front opposition faction was formed by 26 deputies after the elections.

Bibliography
Палітычная гісторыя незалежнай Беларусі / Пад рэд. Валера Булгакава. Вільня, Інстытут Беларусістыкі. — 2006. — 744 с.

References

12th Belarusian Supreme Council
Belarus
Supreme Soviet election
Parliamentary elections in Belarus